Dragon's breath is a special type of incendiary-effect round for 12 gauge shotguns. Dragon's breath consists primarily of magnesium pellets/shards. Dragon's breath is normally chambered in 12-gauge ″ shot shells. The rounds are safe to fire out of an improved cylinder bore as well as a modified choke barrel, common on many shotguns.

Overview
While its combat or tactical usage remains undocumented, the visual effect it produces is impressive and entertaining, similar to that of a short-ranged flamethrower or fireworks. Some enthusiasts claim that the rounds are often used as a distress signal, similar to a very short duration emergency flare gun.

Compared to mass-produced shotgun ammunition, the pyrotechnic shell is somewhat expensive, costing $3 USD per .410 gauge shell and upwards depending on caliber and load. Due to the shells being low-pressure charged rounds, they are not suited for use in a semi-automatic shotgun: They do not produce enough recoil energy to cycle the automated action, causing the mechanism to fail to cycle.

Legality

United States

The sale of Dragon's breath rounds is illegal in several states (Alaska, California, Florida, Hawaii, Illinois, Iowa, Massachusetts, and New York) and shipping may be restricted in other locations and cities  due to their inherent fire hazard.

See also
 Incendiary ammunition
 Tracer ammunition

References

Magnesium
Shotgun shells